Jay Robert Johnson (born December 21, 1989) is a Canadian professional baseball pitcher who is a free agent. Prior to beginning his professional career, he played college baseball at Texas Tech University. He has also competed for the Canadian national baseball team.

Career
Johnson went to Vauxhall High School in Vauxhall, Alberta, then enrolled at Lethbridge College. He transferred to Texas Tech University, where he played college baseball for the Texas Tech Red Raiders baseball team in the Big 12 Conference of NCAA Division I.

Johnson was selected by the Baltimore Orioles in the 25th round of the 2009 MLB draft and the Toronto Blue Jays in the 26th round of the 2010 MLB draft, but did not sign with either club due to concerns about the health of his left elbow. Johnson signed with the Philadelphia Phillies prior to the 2011 season. He pitched for the Lakewood BlueClaws of the Class-A  South Atlantic League in 2011, pitching to a 1–5 win–loss record, a 2.94 earned run average and five saves in 40 appearances.

International career
Johnson played for the Canada national baseball team.

In 2011, he participated in the 2011 Baseball World Cup, winning the bronze medal, and the Pan American Games, winning the gold medal.

In 2013, he participated in the 2013 World Baseball Classic. During the Pool D Play portion , Johnson was seen throwing haymakers as part of the brawl with Team Mexico.

On January 9, 2019, he selected in the 2019 Pan American Games Qualifier.

References

External links

1989 births
Living people
Baseball people from New Brunswick
Baseball pitchers
Baseball players at the 2011 Pan American Games
Canadian expatriate baseball players in the United States
Clearwater Threshers players
Florida Complex League Phillies players
Lakewood BlueClaws players
Pan American Games gold medalists for Canada
Pan American Games medalists in baseball
People from Kings County, New Brunswick
Peoria Javelinas players
Perth Heat players
Québec Capitales players
Reading Fightin Phils players
Reading Phillies players
Texas Tech Red Raiders baseball players
World Baseball Classic players of Canada
2013 World Baseball Classic players
Medalists at the 2011 Pan American Games
Canadian expatriate baseball players in Australia